The Alps Tour is a developmental professional golf tour for men which is sanctioned by the national golf associations of France, Italy, Austria, Switzerland and Morocco. Established in 2001, it is a third level tour, the highest level of men's golf in Europe being the European Tour, and the second level being the Challenge Tour. Other third level tours in Europe include the United Kingdom-based PGA EuroPro Tour, the Germany-based Pro Golf Tour, and the Nordic League in the Nordic countries.  Beginning in July 2015, the four third-level tours will carry Official World Golf Ranking points.

Like the other third-tier European tours, the top ten players on the Order of Merit are exempt through the second stage of European Tour Qualifying School, and the top five win playing privileges on the Challenge Tour.

Alumni who have gone on to win on the European Tour include Marco Crespi, Guido Migliozzi, Chris Paisley, Julien Quesne, and Matt Wallace.

Order of Merit winners

Notes

References

External links

Professional golf tours
Golf in France
Golf in Italy
Golf in Austria
Golf in Switzerland
Golf in Morocco